Wedekind may refer to the following persons:
 Claus Wedekind, a biological researcher
 Frank Wedekind (1864–1918), a German playwright
 Hermann Wedekind (1910–1998), an artistic director
 Luther Lochman von Wedekind (1864–1935), a medical officer in the U.S. Navy on USS Solace (AH-2)
  (1883–1961), a German paleontologist